Sahamandrevo is a town in the region of Anosy in Madagascar in southern central Madagascar. It lies on the Onilahy River. The next city is Betroka.

Populated places in Anosy